WAGR (1340 AM) is a radio station broadcasting a Gospel music format to the Lumberton, North Carolina, United States, area.  The station is currently owned by WAGR Broadcasting, Inc.

History
Al Kahn bought WAGR in January 1957, 27 months after the station signed on, and signed WJSK on the air in 1964. He ran both stations until 1992.

After Messa Corp. bought the stations from Southeastern Broadcasting Corp. in July 1992, WAGR and WJSK ended their tradition of airing only Lumberton high school football and began carrying games involving other Robeson County teams.

In 1993, Arthur DeBerry and Associates of Durham bought WAGR and WJSK.

After WJSK was sold to Cape Fear Broadcasting in 1998, Wes Cookman, owner of Fayetteville radio station WIDU, bought WAGR, along with WEWO in Laurinburg.

Later, Cookman added WFMO in Fairmont to what was called "WE-DO" network, whose black gospel and news and information programming originated from the WIDU studios.

References

External links

Gospel radio stations in the United States
AGR